Neal Sixten Gibs (born 1 January 2002) is a German professional footballer who plays as a full-back for FC Astoria Walldorf on loan from 1. FC Kaiserslautern.

Career
Gibs joined 1. FC Kaiserslautern in 2013 at the age of 11. He signed his first professional contract with the club in May 2021.

On 16 August 2022, Gibs extended his contract with Kaiserslautern and was loaned to FC Astoria Walldorf for the 2022–23 season.

References

External links
 

2002 births
Living people
People from Landstuhl
German footballers
Association football fullbacks
3. Liga players
Oberliga (football) players
1. FC Kaiserslautern players
1. FC Kaiserslautern II players
FC Astoria Walldorf players
Footballers from Rhineland-Palatinate
21st-century German people